Lovely Is the Summer Night (Swedish: Ljuvlig är sommarnatten) is a 1961 Swedish mystery thriller film directed by Arne Mattsson. The film stars Karl-Arne Holmsten, Christina Carlwind, Per Oscarsson and Folke Sundquist. It was shot at the Sundbyberg Studios of Europa Film in Stockholm. The film's sets were designed by the art directors Bertil Duroj and Arne Åkermark. It is an adaptation of a detective novel by Dagmar Lange (Maria Lang), who wrote the script for the film herself. It is a sequel to the 1960 film When Darkness Falls.

Cast
Karl-Arne Holmsten as Christer Wijk
Christina Carlwind as Anneli Hammar
Elisabeth Odén as Dina Richardsson, Anneli's best friend
Per Oscarsson as Lars-Ove Larsson, Anneli's childhood friend
Folke Sundquist as Joakim Kruse, Anneli's fiancé
Sif Ruud as Gretel Ström, Annelis mother
Erik Hell as Egon Ström, Annelis stepfather
Stig Järrel as Sebastian Petrén, Anneli's boss
Hjördis Petterson as Fanny Falkman, florist
Angelo Zanolli as Mats Norrgård
Märta Arbin as Helena Wijk, Christers mother
Holger Löwenadler as Inspector
 Dagmar Olsson as Livia Petrén
 Agneta Prytz as Olivia Petrén
 Allan Edwall as Luffaren
 Sven-Eric Gamble as 	Truck Driver
 Curt Masreliez as 	Ahlgren
 Elsa Prawitz as 	Camilla Martin
 John Norrman as 	Forest Warden
 Tekla Sjöblom as Gustava Eriksson
 Curt Löwgren as 	Matsäcken
 Monica Karlsson as Eva 
 Julia Cæsar as 	Dresser 
 Carl-Axel Elfving as 	Frisör-Kalle 
 Mona Geijer-Falkner as 	Tale-telling Woman 
 Tommy Johnson as 	Young Man 
 Per Johnsson as Unit Manager 
 Åke Lindström as 	Man 
 Sune Mangs as 	Jailer 
 Sten Mattsson as 	Stage Manager 
 John Melin as Head Waiter 
 Karin Miller as 	Mrs. Gehlin 
 Marrit Ohlsson as Gossip Lady 
 Bellan Roos as Tale-telling Woman
 Bo Samuelsson as Mailman 
 Hanny Schedin as Tale-telling Woman 
 Arne Strand as Vicar

References

Bibliography 
 Björklund, Elisabet & Larsson, Mariah. Swedish Cinema and the Sexual Revolution: Critical Essays. McFarland, 2016.
 Qvist, Per Olov & von Bagh, Peter. Guide to the Cinema of Sweden and Finland. Greenwood Publishing Group, 2000.

External links

1961 films
Swedish thriller films
Films directed by Arne Mattsson
1960s thriller films
1960s Swedish-language films
Films based on Swedish novels
Swedish sequel films
1960s Swedish films